"Cry Baby" is the sixth official single from American soul singer Cee Lo Green's third studio album, The Lady Killer. The single was released via digital download and promotional CD single on October 10, 2011. The single version of the track is a slightly different remix of the track, featuring a slightly faster beat and tempo. The music video for the song was premiered on August 8, 2011 through Cee Lo Green's official YouTube channel. The single has so far peaked at #58 on the UK Singles Chart due to strong downloads from The Lady Killer.

Live performances
Green has performed the song live several times, including appearances on The Jonathan Ross Show on October 1, 2011, and BBC Radio 1's Live Lounge on October 4. He was expected to perform the song live during the live finals of The X Factor on October 9, 2011 but instead sang a medley of "Satisfied" and "Forget You".

Music video
The music video features Jaleel White performing as Cee-Lo Green, as Green was unavailable for filming at the time. The video features White leaving his girlfriend (Tanya Chisholm), and claiming to feel like the bad guy for doing so. He is subsequently surrounded by a group of people in the street, who begin dancing alongside him and performing the song.

Track listing
Digital Download
 "Cry Baby" (Single Version) - 3:44
 "Cry Baby" (T.C. Remix) - 4:03
 "Cry Baby" (Live At Maida Vale) - 3:31
 "Cry Baby" (Music Video)

 UK Promotional CD Single
 "Cry Baby" (Single Version) - 3:44
 "Cry Baby" (Instrumental) - 3:44

Other Versions
"Cry Baby" (Moto Blanco Club Mix)
"Cry Baby" (Moto Blanco Instrumental)
"Cry Baby" (Moto Blanco Radio Edit)

Credits and personnel
Lead vocals – Cee Lo Green
Producers – Fraser T Smith
Lyrics – Callaway, Fraser T Smith, Rick Nowels
Label: Elektra Records
Drums - John Wicks

Charts

Release history

References

2010 songs
2011 singles
CeeLo Green songs
Elektra Records singles
Song recordings produced by Fraser T. Smith
Songs written by CeeLo Green
Songs written by Fraser T. Smith
Songs written by Rick Nowels